Mario Turner (born 11 July 1951) is an Italian equestrian. He competed at the 1972 Summer Olympics and the 1976 Summer Olympics.

References

1951 births
Living people
Italian male equestrians
Olympic equestrians of Italy
Equestrians at the 1972 Summer Olympics
Equestrians at the 1976 Summer Olympics
Sportspeople from Milan